The Dechinta Centre for Research & Learning is an Indigenous-led educational establishment in Yellowknife, Canada. It is the only land-based accredited university program in the world.

Activities 
Dechinta is Indigenous-led, and serves Indigenous peoples in Canada at its location near Blachford Lake in Yellowknife, Canada. It is the only land-based accredited university program in the world and has been providing educational services for over ten years.

Dechinta develops land-based culturally immersive programming in collaboration with local Indigenous communities. Programming includes instruction from Elders, land-based practitioners, Knowledge Holders and Indigenous academics in order to prepare students for leadership roles in their communities with a focus on land-based practices, governance, self-determination, gender and artistic practice.

Dechinta delivers culturally-relevant educational programming that prioritises reconnection, skill-building, knowledge and practice with the land. Dechinta prioritizes the importance of being together on the land, learning with the land, and having a strong relationship to the land. Dechinta directly fulfils many of the Truth and Reconciliation Commission’s education recommendations, including closing the education gap by delivering culturally appropriate and community developed curricula, enabling parent and community responsibility and control, and respecting and honouring Indigenous government relationships.

Dechinta's programming is grounded in a holistic approach to education, which includes comprehensive wrap around services such as free integrated childcare, on-site counselling, and health services. Dechinta is committed to creating programs that are family inclusive and safe spaces for gender non-conforming and Indigenous queer and two-spirit folks. Dechinta's curriculum that ensures all Indigenous women, girls, and queer/trans/Two-spirit people are provided with safe, no-barrier, permanent, and meaningful access to their cultures and languages in order to restore, reclaim, and revitalize their cultures and identities.

Dechinta is currently committed to expanding their partnerships and developing programming in different regions in the north. Dechinta has on-going partnerships with several academic institutions including the University of British Columbia, the University of Alberta., Collège Nordique Francophone  and Aurora College.

Dechinta has recently completed a research project investigating the impact of COVID-19 on land-based education with funding from the Mastercard Foundation.

Controversy
Dechinta has been criticized by traditional Dene and Inuk elders for "whitewashing" Indigenous culture. This criticism is due to Dechinta teaching things that are in fact not traditional.

References

External links
 Official website

Education in the Northwest Territories
2010 establishments in Canada